Exanthica is a genus of moths of the family Yponomeutidae.

Species
Exanthica atelacma - Meyrick, 1926 
Exanthica trigonella - Felder, 1875 

Yponomeutidae